Trap God is a mixtape by American rapper Gucci Mane, released on October 17, 2012. The mixtape was announced on July 31, 2012, with no release date notified. However, on August 8, Gucci announced that October 17, 2012, would be the date of the release. The mixtape features major guest appearances from Rick Ross, Waka Flocka Flame, Meek Mill, Future, T-Pain, Kevin McCall, Trae Tha Truth, Kirko Bangz, and Birdman, as well as up and coming rapper Young Scooter who is featured on 6 of the tracks.

Background
On September 19, 2012, the first song was released in promotion of the mixtape titled "Fuck The World" featuring Future. On October 4, 2012, the music video was released for "Head Shots" featuring Rick Ross. On October 8, 2012, the music video was released for "Money Habits" featuring Young Scooter. On October 12, 2012, the music video was released for "Get Lost" featuring Birdman. On October 13, 2012, the music video was released for "Truth". On October 15, 2012, the music video was released for "Dead Man" featuring Young Scooter and Trae tha Truth. On October 17, 2012, the music video was released for "Fuck The World" featuring Future. On October 31, 2012, the music video was released for "Crazy" featuring Waka Flocka Flame. On November 7, 2012, the music video was released for "Gas and Mud". On February 20, 2013, the music video was released for "Shooter" featuring Young Scooter and Yung Fresh.

Critical reception 

Trap God was met with generally favorable reviews from music critics. Calvin Stovall of BET gave the mixtape four out of five stars, saying "Trap God doesn't necessarily cement Radric Davis’ legacy, but it certainly proves that he is capable of standing alongside his peers as an MC and a businessman." Miles Raymer of Pitchfork Media gave the mixtape a 7.2 out of ten, saying "Trap God has the lyrics and the punchline frequency (as well as the nasally congested, marble-mouthed flow), but it's short on the trademark Gucci vocal tics." Edwin Ortiz of HipHopDX said "“In retrospect, this is a similar formula utilized on his last mixtape I’m Up, which featured a Rap-stacked deck to masked Gucci Mane’s weaknesses."

Track listing

Charts

References

2012 mixtape albums
Gucci Mane albums
Albums produced by Drumma Boy
Albums produced by Lex Luger
Albums produced by Honorable C.N.O.T.E.
Albums produced by Mike Will Made It
Albums produced by Shawty Redd
Albums produced by Zaytoven
Albums produced by Detail (record producer)
Albums produced by Southside (record producer)